San Jerónimo is a district of the Moravia canton, in the San José province of Costa Rica.

Geography 
San Jerónimo has an area of  km² and an elevation of  metres.

Demographics 

For the 2011 census, San Jerónimo had a population of  inhabitants.

Transportation

Road transportation 
The district is covered by the following road routes:
 National Route 32
 National Route 307
 National Route 308
 National Route 309

References 

Districts of San José Province
Populated places in San José Province